Daniel Fleming (born 8 July 1992) is a Wales international rugby league footballer who plays as a  for Featherstone Rovers in the Betfred Championship.

He previously played for the Castleford Tigers (Heritage № 938) in the Super League, the Bradford Bulls in the Championship and the Toronto Wolfpack in League 1.

Background
Fleming was born in Halifax, West Yorkshire, England.

Playing career
Fleming made his Super League début for Castleford against London Broncos in 2013.

In June 2014, Fleming signed for Bradford Bulls on a two-year deal.

2015
He featured between round 4 and round 12 and then between round 19 and round 21. Fleming also played in round 23 against Halifax. Fleming played in qualifier 7 against Halifax. He featured in the Challenge Cup in round 5 against the Hull Kingston Rovers.

2016
Fleming featured in the pre-season friendlies against Leeds and Castleford. He featured between round 7 and round 11. Fleming later joined Swinton Lions on loan for the remainder of the season.

In August 2016 it was announced that Fleming would be joining Toronto Wolfpack for their inaugural season in 2017.

International career
Fleming is a Wales international, having made his début against France in 2012. He was named in the Wales squad for the 2013 Rugby League World Cup but did not feature in the tournament.

He played in the 2014 European Cup.

He was selected in the Wales 9s squad for the 2019 Rugby League World Cup 9s.

References

External links
Halifax profile
(archived by web.archive.org) Toronto Wolfpack profile
(archived by web.archive.org) Castleford Tigers profile
Wales profile
Welsh profile

1992 births
Living people
Batley Bulldogs players
Bradford Bulls players
Castleford Tigers players
English rugby league players
English people of Welsh descent
Featherstone Rovers players
Halifax R.L.F.C. players
Oxford Rugby League players
Rochdale Hornets players
Rugby league players from Halifax, West Yorkshire
Rugby league props
Swinton Lions players
Toronto Wolfpack players
Wales national rugby league team players
York City Knights players